Linköping/Saab Airport , branded as Linköping City Airport, is situated in Linköping, Sweden. The airport is shared between civil aviation and Saab.

Airlines and destinations

Statistics

See also
 List of the largest airports in the Nordic countries

References

External links

Official website

Airports in Sweden
International airports in Sweden